William Everett Wing (born William Ernett Wing; July 4, 1869 – March 10, 1947) was an American screenwriter of the silent era. He wrote "scenarios" for at more than 90 films between 1912 and 1927. Born in Gardiner, Maine, he died in Los Angeles, California.

Selected filmography

 Olaf—An Atom (1913)
 Red Hicks Defies the World (1913)
 A Woman in the Ultimate (1913)
 Casey at the Bat (1916)
 Sold for Marriage (1916)
 The Brazen Beauty (1918)
 Lure of the Circus (1918)
 The Iron Man (1924)
 The Riddle Rider (1924)
 Reckless Speed (1924)
 The Breathless Moment (1924)
 Battling Mason (1924)
 Speed Madness (1925)
 The Coast Patrol (1925)
 Makers of Men (1925)
 Savages of the Sea (1925)
 Vic Dyson Pays (1925)
 Glenister of the Mounted (1926)
 Born to Battle (1926)
 The Two-Gun Man (1926)
The Masquerade Bandit (1926)
 Hands Across the Border (1926)
 Tarzan and the Golden Lion (1927)

External links

"William E. Wing – Star Photoplaywright", July 1914 interview in The Photoplay Author

1869 births
1947 deaths
American male screenwriters
20th-century American male writers
20th-century American screenwriters